Al Hamidiyah is the name of a suburb in Ajman.

Populated places in the Emirate of Ajman